Cynodon septenarius is one of three species of dogtooth characins in the genus Cynodon. It is the most recently described member of its genus. This fish is found in tropical fresh waters of South America, including the Amazon and Orinoco basins, and rivers in Guyana.

Description
It largely resembles the better-known relative C. gibbus.

References

 [a b] Bisby F.A., Roskov Y.R., Orrell T.M., Nicolson D., Paglinawan L.E., Bailly N., Kirk P.M., Bourgoin T., Baillargeon G., Ouvrard D. (red.) (2011). "Species 2000 & ITIS Catalogue of Life: 2011 Annual Checklist.". Species 2000: Reading, UK. Läst 24 September 2012.

Cynodontidae
Freshwater fish of Brazil
Freshwater fish of Colombia
Fish of Guyana
Fish of the Amazon basin
Fish described in 2000